Proegmenomyia is a genus of flies in the family Stratiomyidae.

Species
Proegmenomyia metallica Kertész, 1914

References

Stratiomyidae
Brachycera genera
Taxa named by Kálmán Kertész
Diptera of South America